Ummah is the Muslim world.

Ummah may also refer to:

 The Ummah, a music-production collective
 Ummah Foods, a food manufacturer of the United Kingdom

See also

 My Ummah